Gelişen is a village in Derecik District in Hakkâri Province in Turkey. The village is populated by Kurds of the Gerdî tribe and had a population of 4,122 in 2022.

The village has the nine hamlets of Adıgüzel, Aralık, Beğendik, Karakoç, Koryürek, Kütüklu, Mordağ, Suçıktı and Toklu attached to it.

History 
The village was attached to Şemdinli District before becoming part of the newly-created Derecik District in 2018.

Name 
The name Şepatan (Shepātān) may be connected to the word Sciabatan mentioned by Assemani.

Population 
Population history of the village from 2000 to 2022:

References 

Villages in Derecik District
Kurdish settlements in Hakkâri Province